Dermacol is a Czech personal care company founded in 1966 in Prague. It is the leading Czech manufacturer and seller of make-up and decorative and skin cosmetics. In the 1960s, the company introduced one of the first make-up covers in Europe and in the world in general.

History
Olga Knoblochová from the Czechoslovak Institute of Medical Cosmetics was behind the expansion of the first make-up Dermacol, as well as Barrandov Film Studios, where they developed it and manufactured it until the 1990s. The word "Dermacol" became synonymous with make-up in general in then Czechoslovakia. The name originated from the Latin words derma (skin) and color = Dermacol.

In 1969, the film studios in Hollywood bought a license and produced licensed high cover makeup from Dermacol. The Dermacol line was then expanded by care cosmetics, make-up removers, body care products and cosmetics intended for all skin types. Dermacol Make-up Cover is still produced today, with around 3,000,000 pieces sold annually worldwide.

Dermacol is a family company today. It consists of a Czecho-Slovak couple – Věra Komárová, together with her husband Vladimír Komár, who have owned and managed the company since 1992. Today, the Dermacol brand is carried by about a thousand products, of which about 15 products have been manufactured according to the original recipe for more than 50 years. It is on sale in more than 70 countries.

References

External links 
 eu.dermacol.cz

1966 establishments in Czechoslovakia
Chemical companies established in 1966
History of cosmetics
Czech brands
Manufacturing companies of Czechoslovakia
Cosmetics brands